Mark Spencer Brewer (October 22, 1837 – March 18, 1901) was a politician from the U.S. state of Michigan.

Early life and education
Brewer was born in Addison Township, Michigan and attended the rural schools and Romeo and Oxford Academies. He studied law, was admitted to the bar in 1864 and commenced practice in Pontiac. He was city attorney of Pontiac in 1866 and 1867 and circuit court commissioner for Oakland County 1866-1869. He was a member of the Michigan State Senate from the 20th District 1873-1874.

Political career
Brewer was elected as a Republican to the United States House of Representatives from Michigan's 6th District for the 45th and 46th Congresses, serving from March 4, 1877 to March 3, 1881.

He was appointed consul general to Berlin on June 30, 1881, by U.S. President James A. Garfield and served from August 29, 1881, until June 7, 1885. He was again elected to the U.S. House for the 50th and 51st Congresses, serving from March 4, 1887 to March 3, 1891. He declined to be a candidate for renomination in 1890 and resumed the practice of law in Pontiac.

He was a delegate to the 1896 Republican National Convention and was appointed a member of the United States Civil Service Commission by President William McKinley January 18, 1898, and served until his death in Washington, D.C.

He is interred in Oak Hill Cemetery, in Pontiac, Michigan.

References

The Political Graveyard

1837 births
1901 deaths
Burials in Michigan
Republican Party Michigan state senators
Politicians from Pontiac, Michigan
Michigan lawyers
American consuls
Republican Party members of the United States House of Representatives from Michigan
19th-century American politicians
19th-century American diplomats
19th-century American lawyers